Estrofurate (INN, USAN) (developmental code name AY-11483), also known as 17α-(3-furyl)-estra-1,3,5(10),7-tetraene-3,17-diol 3-acetate, is a synthetic, steroidal estrogen that was synthesized in 1967 and studied in the late 1960s and early 1970s but was never marketed. It is a relatively weak estrogen in bioassays.

References 

Acetate esters
Estranes
Synthetic estrogens
3-Furyl compounds